The Dent de Nendaz (literally "Tooth of Nendaz") is a mountain of the Swiss Pennine Alps, overlooking Nendaz in the canton of Valais. Its  summit can be easily reached from the cable car station of Tracouet (2,200 m).

References

External links
 Dent de Nendaz on Hikr

Mountains of the Alps
Mountains of Switzerland
Mountains of Valais
Two-thousanders of Switzerland